Sir Denis Henry Truscott, GBE, TD (9 July 1908 – 4 February 1989) was a British businessman who served as the Lord Mayor of London from 1957 to 1958.

References 
Who Was Who

External links 

 

1908 births
1989 deaths
Knights Bachelor
20th-century lord mayors of London
Knights Grand Cross of the Order of the British Empire
British businesspeople
People educated at Rugby School
Alumni of Magdalene College, Cambridge
Aldermen of the City of London
Sheriffs of the City of London